Emily J. Reynolds (born c. 1956) is an American political aide who served as the Secretary of the United States Senate from January 7, 2003 to January 3, 2007.  She was appointed Secretary of the Senate when the United States Senate convened on January 7, 2003, for the 108th Congress. Prior to her appointment as Secretary, Reynolds was the chief of staff for Senator Bill Frist. She is the thirty-first person, and the fifth woman, to serve as Secretary of the Senate.

Early life and education 
A native of Nashville, Reynolds received a Bachelor of Arts in political science and broadcasting from Stephens College in Columbia, Missouri.

Career 
Immediately following her graduation in 1978, she was named as the college's associate director of admissions. She has remained active with her alma mater and served on the board of curators and as chair of the alumnae development board.

Reynolds began her career in politics in 1980 as a special assistant to Senator Howard Baker.  In 1985 she worked on the successful Senate campaign of then-Governor Kit Bond of Missouri. Subsequently Reynolds worked in seven statewide campaigns in six states, including the Senate campaigns of John Danforth, John Heinz, and Kay Bailey Hutchison. She joined the Bush–Quayle re-election campaign in 1992 as deputy director of national coalitions.

Reynolds returned to her home state of Tennessee in November 1993 to serve as deputy campaign manager and finance director for Frist's Senate campaign. During Senator Frist's first term in the Senate, Reynolds became his state director. She then managed his successful reelection campaign in 2000. As chief of staff for Senator Frist from January 2001, Reynolds supervised his Washington, D.C. and Tennessee offices.

Reynolds joined TVA in April 2007 as Senior Vice President of Communications, Government & Valley Relations. Her office is located in Nashville and she reports directly to TVA's CEO, Tom Kilgore.

References

External links
 

1956 births
Living people
People from Nashville, Tennessee
Secretaries of the United States Senate
Stephens College alumni